Solombala-English, or Solombala English–Russian Pidgin, is a little-known pidgin, derived from both English and Russian, that was spoken in the port of Solombala in the city of Arkhangelsk (Archangel), Russia in the 18th and 19th centuries.

The known Solombala-English corpus consists of only two short 19th-century texts: one in Очерки Архангельской губернии (Sketches from Arkhangelsk governorate) by Vasilij Vereščagin from 1849, and one in Архангельские Губернские Ведомости (Arkhangelsk Governorate News) from 1867.


References

Primary sources

Secondary sources

See also
Russenorsk

Languages of Russia
Extinct languages of Europe
Russian-based pidgins and creoles
Languages attested from the 18th century
Languages extinct in the 19th century
English-based pidgins and creoles
Arkhangelsk
History of Arkhangelsk Oblast
Culture of Arkhangelsk Oblast